The following is a list of members or people closely associated with the International Society for Krishna Consciousness. This list is not exhaustive.

Founder-Acharya 
A. C. Bhaktivedanta Swami Prabhupada – Founded the movement in New York in 1966.

Member disciples of A. C. Bhaktivedanta Swami Prabhupada
Listed by date of first initiation:
Kirtanananda Swami – (1937–2011)initiated 1966
Mukunda Goswami* – initiated 1966
Satsvarupa Dasa Goswami* – initiated 1966
Jayananda Dasa – initiated 1967
Hansadutta Swami – initiated 1967
Tamala Krishna Goswami (1946–2002) – initiated 1968
Vishnujana Swami (1948–1976) – initiated 1968 
Jayadvaita Swami* – initiated 1968
Jayapataka Swami – initiated 1968
Giriraja Swami – initiated 1969
Bhaktisvarupa Damodar Swami (Dr. Thoudam Damodar Singh, PhD 1937–2006) – initiated 1971
Indradyumna Swami – initiated 1971
Ranchor Dasa – initiated 1971
Romapada Swami – initiated 1971
Sacinandana Swami – initiated 1972
Garuda Dasa – initiated 1973
Bhakti Tirtha Swami (1950–2005) – initiated – 1973
Radhanath Swami – initiated 1973
Bhakti Caitanya Swami – initiated 1973                                      
Ambarisa Dasa (Alfred B. Ford), the great grandson of Henry Ford – initiated 1975
Sadaputa Dasa (Dr. Richard L. Thompson, PhD 1947 – 2008) – initiated 1975
Satyaraja Dasa (Steven J. Rosen) – initiated 1976
Bhakti Caru Swami (1945 - 2020) – initiated 1976
Drutakarma Dasa (Michael A. Cremo) – initiated 1976

*Not Accepting Disciples

Member grand disciples of Prabhupada 
Kadamba Kanana Swami 
Radhika Ramana Dasa (Dr. Ravi M. Gupta, PhD)
Shaunaka Rishi Dasa
Yadunandana Swami

Members and patrons in popular culture and the media
Allen Ginsberg American "beat generation" poet
Annie Lennox (now an agnostic), lead singer of popular British pop rock duo Eurythmics
Boy George, English singer
Chrissie Hynde, lead singer and guitarist of the British–American rock band The Pretenders.
Crispian Mills, lead singer and guitarist of the English rock band Kula Shaker
George Harrison, English guitarist, singer, songwriter, record producer, and film producer, best known as a member of The Beatles.
Hayley Mills, English actress, daughter of John Mills. Mother of Crispian Mills from Kula Shaker
Henry Doktorski, American concert accordionist
John Joseph and Harley Flanagan, from hardcore band Cro-Mags
Marc Ellis, New Zealand rugby league and rugby union player
Poly Styrene and Lora Logic, from British 1970s punk band X-Ray Spex
Ray Cappo, of Youth of Today and Shelter
Russell Brand, English comedian, actor, columnist, author and presenter of radio and television
Vic DiCara, guitarist for Los Angeles bands Inside Out and 108

See also 
 List of International Society for Krishna Consciousness sannyasis

Notes

External links

Srila Prabhupada disciple database
 ISKCON Leaders

Hinduism-related lists
 Members